Magne Johansen (born 18 January 1965) is a Norwegian ski jumper who competed from 1987 to 1993. He won a silver medal in the team large hill event at the 1989 FIS Nordic World Ski Championships.

Johansen's best individual finish at the Winter Olympics was 18th in the individual normal hill at Albertville in 1992. He finished 13th in the 1992 Ski-flying World Championships. Johansen's best individual career finish was fourth in the normal hill in 1992 in St. Moritz. He competed for Byåsen I.L. in Trondheim.

References

Norwegian male ski jumpers
Olympic ski jumpers of Norway
1965 births
Living people
Ski jumpers at the 1992 Winter Olympics
FIS Nordic World Ski Championships medalists in ski jumping
20th-century Norwegian people